Pygothrips is a genus of thrips in the family Phlaeothripidae.

Species
 Pygothrips albiceps
 Pygothrips brevis
 Pygothrips callipygus
 Pygothrips flavomaculatus
 Pygothrips fortis
 Pygothrips fusculus
 Pygothrips longiceps
 Pygothrips magnicauda
 Pygothrips mikrommatos
 Pygothrips needhami
 Pygothrips postocellaris
 Pygothrips pygus
 Pygothrips rugicauda
 Pygothrips sculpticauda
 Pygothrips shavianus
 Pygothrips vicinus
 Pygothrips zeteki

References

Phlaeothripidae
Thrips
Thrips genera